East Side, West Side is a 1927 American drama film directed by Allan Dwan and starring George O'Brien (in the same year that he played the lead in F.W. Murnau's Sunrise: A Song of Two Humans), Virginia Valli, and June Collyer. The supporting cast includes J. Farrell MacDonald and Holmes Herbert.

The film is preserved at the Museum of Modern Art, New York.

The film was remade in 1931 as Skyline with Thomas Meighan and Hardie Albright.

Cast
George O'Brien as John Breen
Virginia Valli as Becka Lipvitch
J. Farrell MacDonald as Pug Malone
Dore Davidson as Channon Lipvitch
Sonia Nodell as Mrs. Lipvitch (credited as Sonia Nodalsky)
June Collyer as Josephine
John Miltern as Gerrit Rantoul
Holmes Herbert as Gilbert Van Horn
Frank Dodge as Judge Kelly
Dan Wolheim as Grogan
Johnny Dooley as Grogan gang member
John Kearney as Policeman
Edward Garvey as Second
Frank Allworth as Flash
William Frederic as Breen
Jack La Rue as dining extra (uncredited)

References

External links

1927 films
Films directed by Allan Dwan
1927 drama films
Silent American drama films
Fox Film films
Films set in New York City
Films shot in New York City
American black-and-white films
American silent feature films
1920s American films